Saint-Cyr-sous-Dourdan (literally Saint-Cyr under Dourdan) is a commune in the Essonne department in Île-de-France in northern France.

Inhabitants of Saint-Cyr-sous-Dourdan are known as Saint-Cyriens.

See also
Communes of the Essonne department

References

External links

Mayors of Essonne Association 

Communes of Essonne